Ceratozamia becerrae is a species of plant in the family Zamiaceae.

It is endemic to Mexico, where it is known only from the states of Chiapas and Tabasco. There are only two known populations. The plants grow in rainforest habitat on karst substrates.

This species was described to science in 2004.

References

becerrae
Endemic flora of Mexico
Flora of Chiapas
Flora of Tabasco
Endangered plants
Endangered biota of Mexico
Plants described in 2004
Taxonomy articles created by Polbot